Aix is a bird genus that contains two species of ducks: the wood duck (Aix sponsa), and the Mandarin duck (Aix galericulata). Aix is an Ancient Greek word used by Aristotle to refer to an unknown diving bird.

Taxonomy
The genus belongs to the family Anatidae in the waterfowl order Anseriformes. They were formerly placed in the "perching ducks", a paraphyletic group somewhat intermediate between shelducks and dabbling ducks, and it is not quite clear whether they should be placed in the Anatinae (dabbling duck) or Tadorninae (shelduck) subfamily.

Extant species

Habitat
Both species migrate from the northern parts of their respective ranges to winter in the south of the range. They inhabit quiet wooded streams and ponds.

Description
The two species are generally considered to be very attractive, particularly the multi-coloured drakes. The genus shows marked sexual dimorphism (differences between the sexes), with the females being smaller and less colorful.

Diet
Wood ducks will consume small crustaceans, insects, and plant matter. Mandarin ducks are mainly vegetarian.

Breeding
Wood ducks are reproductively capable around the age of one year. They are monogamous for the season. Mating occurs between February and April, depending on latitude. The clutch size is between 6 and 15, and the incubation period is about 30 days. The young are precocial. They venture from the cavity nest at one day old and are cared for by the mother for about 60 days. The young have a very high mortality rate. Wood ducks normally live 3 to 4 years.

Mandarin ducks are also monogamous. The courtship ritual, like the plumage, is rather showy. The female lays between 9 and 12 eggs in a cavity nest, then incubates them for about 30 days. Parental care by the mother is a little shorter in this species, lasting about 40 days.

Conservation
Both species are affected by loss of habitat. As human development continues to expand, the woodland areas preferred by these ducks continues to shrink. As of 2016, both species had been evaluated for the Red List of the International Union for Conservation of Nature (IUCN), and given a "least concern" rating.

References

Further reading

Harris, M. (1999): Animal Diversity Web: Aix galericulata . Accessed April 27, 2006.
Pope, A. (2004): Animal Diversity Web: Aix sponsa. Accessed April 27, 2006.

 
Ducks
Bird genera